KYWY (95.5 FM) is a radio station licensed to Pine Bluffs, Wyoming. The station is owned by Eric Henderson, through licensee E Media USA LLC. It carries a religious format. The station's tower is located near the town of Albin.

External links

Radio stations established in 2014
2014 establishments in Wyoming
YWY (FM)
Laramie County, Wyoming